Wake Young Men's Leadership Academy (WYMLA) is a public secondary school for boys in Raleigh, North Carolina. It is a part of Wake County Public School System.

It has grades 6–13, with the former Thompson School in Downtown Raleigh having most grades, except the campus of St. Augustine's University  has grades 11 through 13.

History
In 2011 the school system proposed creating single gender schools. Initially they were to be located at William Peace University, but that institution chose not to host them.

It opened in 2012, with Ian Solomon as the first principal.

The ex-Thompson School held all Wake Young Men's students until St. Augustine's formed a partnership in 2013. In 2016 the first class graduated. 

In 2019 Xavier King became the principal.

Athletics
In 2016 it allowed students to play sports at other schools if the sports are not offered at WYLMA, but that year a board member proposed changing the rule.

References

Further reading
  - Discussed in "Wake County's first single-gender public schools hold graduation".

External links
 Wake Young Men's Leadership Academy

Schools in Raleigh, North Carolina
Public high schools in North Carolina
Public middle schools in North Carolina
Public boys' schools in the United States
2012 establishments in North Carolina
Educational institutions established in 2012